Defending champion David Wagner won the quad singles wheelchair tennis title at the 2011 US Open when Peter Norfolk retired from the final, with the score at 7–5, 3–1.

Draw

Final

Round robin
Standings are determined by: 1. number of wins; 2. number of matches; 3. in two-players-ties, head-to-head records; 4. in three-players-ties, percentage of sets won, or of games won; 5. steering-committee decision.

References
Singles Draw

Wheelchair Quad Singles
U.S. Open, 2011 Quad Singles